The Oroch language is a critically endangered language spoken by the Oroch people in Siberia.  It is a member of the southern group of the Tungusic languages and is closely related to the Nanai language and Udege language.  It is or was spoken in the Khabarovsk Krai (Komsomolsky, Sovetskaya Gavan, and Ulchsky districts).  The language is split into three dialects: Tumninsky, Khadinsky, and Hungarisky.  At the beginning of the 21st century, a written form of the language was created. The Russian government and the scientific field disagree on whether the language is living or extinct.
The Oroch language belongs to the southern subgroup of the Tungus-Manchu languages, which are part of the Altaic family of languages.

It is believed that the Oroch language is the closest to Nanai, because a significant group of Nanai (Evenki!) origin (Samagirs) joined the Orochs. Until the beginning of the 20th century, some researchers combined the Orochi with the Udege, considering them as close dialects. In the 30s. it was believed that the Udege language can be considered as a single literary language for both ethnic groups.

Genealogical and areal characteristics 
According to the 2002 Census, there were 257 speakers of the Oroch language, however, this data is known to be erroneous due to confusion with the similarly-named Orok language. According to the 2010 Census, there were 8 people speakers.  However, according to researchers, by the late 1990s, even the oldest Orochi could only utter a few phrases. The Association of Indigenous Peoples of the Khabarovsk Krai stated that the last fluent speaker of the Oroch language died in 2008. In 2010, this association held a meeting of elderly Orochi, who together were able to remember only about 20 Oroch words, and could not count to ten.

Orthography

Phonology

References

Bibliography

 
 
 Альбина Гирфанова (1994). "Орочский язык". Контактологический энциклопедический словарь-справочник: Северный регион. Языки народов Севера, Сибири и Дальнего Востока в контактах с русским языком. М. (1). (in Russian)

External links
 Unesco – Oroch language (In Russian)

Agglutinative languages
Critically endangered languages
Khabarovsk Krai
Languages of Russia
Tungusic languages